Billy-Jean Ale (born 8 May 1991) is a New Zealand rugby league footballer who played for the New Zealand Warriors in the NRL Women's Premiership.

Background
Born in Auckland, Ale played her junior rugby league for the Mt Albert Lions.

Playing career
In 2008, at 17-years old, she was a development player in New Zealand's World Cup-winning squad but did not play a game.

In 2011, Ale represented Samoa against Australia in Apia. On 22 June 2019, she represented Samoa in their 8–46 loss to New Zealand, scoring a try.

In September 2019, Ale joined the New Zealand Warriors NRL Women's Premiership team. In Round 1 of the 2019 NRL Women's Premiership, she made her debut for the Warriors in a 16–12 win over the Sydney Roosters.

On 25 October 2019, she made her debut for New Zealand, coming off the bench in an 8–28 loss to Australia.

References

1991 births
Living people
New Zealand sportspeople of Samoan descent
Samoa women's national rugby league team players
New Zealand women's national rugby league team players
New Zealand female rugby league players
Rugby league props
New Zealand Warriors (NRLW) players